Uno-X Pro Cycling Team may refer to:

Uno-X Pro Cycling Team (men's team), a Norwegian professional cycling team that competes on the UCI World Tour
Uno-X Pro Cycling Team (women's team), a Norwegian professional cycling team that competes on the UCI Women's World Tour
Uno-X Dare Development Team, a Norwegian developmental cycling team that competes on UCI Continental circuits